Two United States Navy ships have been named Alliance.

  , was a sailing frigate of the Continental Navy, and notable for firing the last shots of the Revolutionary War.
  , was a screw gunboat commissioned in 1877 and in service until 1911.

Sources

United States Navy ship names